Tates, mames, kinderlekh ('Fathers, mothers, children'), also known as Barikadn (באַריקאַדן, 'Barricades'), is a Yiddish song from the 1920s associated with the socialist General Jewish Labour Bund movement. The song describes a workers' strike in Łódź; as men, women and children joined in to construct barricades in the streets of the city. Tates, mames, kinderlekh was written by Shmerke Kaczerginski, who later became a Communist Party activist and a partisan fighter. Kaczerginski was only 15 years old at the time the song was written in 1926. The song rapidly became widely popular in the Jewish community in Poland.

Lyrics

External links
Recording of Tates, mames, kinderlekh

References

1926 songs
Bundism in Europe
Bundist songs
Jewish Polish history
Jewish socialism
Jews and Judaism in Łódź
Socialism in Poland
Yiddish culture in Poland
Yiddish-language songs